Lingshou may refer to:

 Lingshou County, Hebei, China
 Lingshou Town, the seat of Lingshou County
An Lingshou, Chinese Buddhist nun